"That'd Be Alright" is a song written by Tia Sillers, Tim Nichols and Mark D. Sanders, and performed by American country music artist Alan Jackson. It was released in December 2002 as the fourth and final single from his album Drive. The song reached the Top 5 on the U.S. Billboard Hot Country Singles & Tracks chart, peaking at number 2.

Music video
The music video was directed by Steven Goldmann. It premiered on CMT on December 13, 2002, when CMT named it a "Hot Shot". It begins with Jackson, Joe Galante (president of Sony BMG's Nashville division at the time, the parent company of Jackson's label) and cinematographer Gerry Aschlag portraying a film director who wants to work in the music video field. The three are in a conference room together with Aschlag discussing his ideas for a new video. Jackson is mostly unimpressed with Aschlag's ideas, but still humors Aschlag by pretending to like his ideas. Finally, Jackson sarcastically reveals Aschlag his own idea - "shoot this thing without me in it," and then, he leaves the room. Then the song starts out with Aschlag attempting to go on with the video shoot by auditioning look-a-likes of Jackson, and even going as far as secretly filming Jackson going about his daily business, and shows the band playing in the barn. A still image from the Mercury Blues video is seen by mouth movements. Another still image from the It's Alright to Be a Redneck video is used by mouth movements. Stock footage from Chattahoochee, Summertime Blues, Don't Rock the Jukebox, and I'll Go On Loving You are used by mouth movements. The video ends with Aschlag daydreaming that the finished project had just won a country music award. A clip from the 2002 Academy of Country Music Awards is seen near the end of the video. Scenes also included Jackson at a Sonic Drive In, and it shows his wife, and it shows him dressed as a space cowboy.

Chart performance
"That'd Be Alright" debuted at number 53 on the U.S. Billboard Hot Country Singles & Tracks for the week of December 14, 2002.

Year-end charts

References

2002 singles
2002 songs
Alan Jackson songs
Songs written by Tim Nichols
Music videos directed by Steven Goldmann
Songs written by Mark D. Sanders
Song recordings produced by Keith Stegall
Arista Nashville singles
Songs written by Tia Sillers